Linch is an Anglican parish, and a loose collection of hamlets that make up the civil parish of the same name in the Chichester District of West Sussex, England,  northwest of Midhurst. It has an eighteenth-century church dedicated to St Luke.

History

Norman period
Linch (Lince) was listed in the Domesday Book (1086) in the ancient hundred of Easebourne as having 14 households: seven villagers, five smallholders and two slaves; with woodland, meadows, ploughing land and a church, it had a value to the lord of the manor, Robert, son of Theobald, of £5.

19th century

21st century
In the 2001 census there were 29 households in the civil parish with a total population of 78 of whom 40 were economically active.

Parish church
According to Kelly's Directory of 1867, the parish church of St Luke was built around 1700. It contains an unusual stained glass window of much earlier date; the stone church is otherwise plain.

Hollycombe Steam Collection
The Hollycombe Steam Collection is in the parish.

References

External links

Further historical information and sources on GENUKI

Villages in West Sussex
Chichester District